The San Benedicto rock wren (Salpinctes obsoletus exsul) is a small extinct passerine which was endemic to San Benedicto Island in the Revillagigedo Islands off Mexico. It was a subspecies of the rock wren.

Extinction

San Benedicto is a volcano, like all the Revillagigedo group. Unlike, for example, Roca Partida, it was still active in recent times. On August 1, 1952, lava fountains started to break out of the Boquerón vent, located in a rift between the two older volcano cones. By around 8:45, ejecta were thrown up for several km in a severe vulcanian eruption of magnitude 3 on the Volcanic Explosivity Index scale; pyroclastic flows rolled over the island.

Two weeks later, the entire island was covered in ash and pumice up to 10 ft (3 m) deep. Bárcena crater, nearly 1100 ft high (over 300 m), rose where the wren's habitat had previously existed. The birds were never seen again.

This rock wren was the only endemic terrestrial bird on San Benedicto. It was one of but two landbirds on San Benedicto, sharing the island with western ravens, which were wiped out by the eruption as well.  Unlike many species that have become extinct in modern times, humans were not responsible for the San Benedicto Rock Wren's extinction.

References

External links
Biogeography of the Islas Revillagigedo, Mexico
The changing status of marine birds breeding at San Benedicto Island, Mexico.

San Benedicto rock wren
Endemic birds of Western Mexico
Extinct animals of Mexico
Extinct birds of North America
Natural history of the Revillagigedo Islands
Bird extinctions since 1500
San Benedicto rock wren
Taxa named by Robert Ridgway